The Washburn Institute of Technology (WU Tech) is a public institute of technology in Topeka, Kansas, United States.  It is part of Washburn University and awards associate degrees and certificates in professional and technical disciplines.

History
The school was established in 1941 as the Topeka Trade School. Kansas lawmakers passed legislation in 1964 creating the Northeast Kansas Vocational Technical School. It became the  Kaw Area Vocational Technical School in 1967 and opened the doors of its current facility in 1968. In 1992, the school became the Kaw Area Technical School. Responsibility for the school was changed from Topeka Unified School District 501 Board of Education to Washburn University in 2008, and the name was changed to Washburn Institute of Technology around that time.

See also

 Education in Kansas
 List of colleges and universities in Kansas

References

External links
 

1964 establishments in Kansas
Buildings and structures in Topeka, Kansas
Education in Topeka, Kansas
Educational institutions established in 1964
Public universities and colleges in Kansas
Schools in Shawnee County, Kansas
Technological universities in the United States
Washburn University
Two-year colleges in the United States